Fragile is a novel by bestselling author Lisa Unger. It is the first book set in The Hollows, and features Jones Cooper.

Awards and honors
Fragile was chosen by ABC's Good Morning America as a top book pick for great summer reads and selected as a Hot Book by Harper's Bazaar. Target named Lisa Unger an "Emerging Author".

References

2010 American novels
American crime novels
Novels by Lisa Unger
Shaye Areheart Books books